The Battle of Britton's Lane occurred September 1, 1862, near the village of Denmark in rural Madison County, Tennessee, during the American Civil War.

Ordered to raid north from Mississippi by Maj. Gen. Sterling Price, commanding the Army of the West, thus to prevent Ulysses S. Grant's reinforcing Maj. Gen. Don Carlos Buell in Tennessee, Brig. Gen. Frank C. Armstrong's cavalry brigade struck Col. Elias S. Dennis's Federal force of two cavalry troops, a battery and two infantry regiments. After four hours, in which they suffered heavy losses while taking 213 prisoners, and two field pieces, the raiders withdrew, their mission accomplished.

References

 Britton Lane American Battlefield Trust

External links
 Britton's Lane Battlefield Association Retrieved: 2008-11-04.
 Big Black Creek Historical Association Website Retrieved: 2011-10-08.

Britton's Lane
Britton's Lane
Britton's Lane
Madison County, Tennessee
1862 in the American Civil War
1862 in Tennessee
September 1862 events